Brovari may refer to the following places in Ukraine:

Brovari, Buchach Raion, Ternopil Oblast
Brovari, Kamianets-Podilskyi Raion, Khmelnytskyi Oblast
 Brovari, the name of the city Brovary before 1969